Adam Darrehsi-ye Olya (also Romanized as Ādam Darrehsī-ye ‘Olyā; also known as Ādam Darrehsī and Ādam Darrehsī-ye Bālā) is a village in Angut-e Gharbi Rural District, Anguti District, Germi County, Ardabil Province, Iran. At the 2006 census, its population was 116, in 24 families.

References 

Towns and villages in Germi County